Nivuru Gappina Nippu is a 1982 Indian Telugu-language action drama film directed by K. Bapayya, produced by A. L. Kumar, written by Bhamidipati Radhakrishna starring Krishna, Sivaji Ganesan, Jaya Prada, M. Prabhakar Reddy and Allu Ramalingaiah. Chakravarty scored and composed the film's soundtrack.

Plot

Cast

Music 
Chakravarty scored and composed the film's soundtrack.

Release and Reception 
Nivuru Gappina Nippu was released on 24 June 1982.

Notes

References

External links 

1982 films
1982 action films
1980s Telugu-language films
Indian action films
Films directed by K. Bapayya
Films scored by K. Chakravarthy